Xenolea asiatica is a species of beetle in the family Cerambycidae. It was described by Maurice Pic in 1925, originally under the genus Aeschopalea. It is known from Laos, India, Thailand, Japan, China, and Vietnam.

References

Lamiinae
Beetles described in 1925